Studnica may refer to the following:
Places
 Studnica, Lower Silesian Voivodeship, south-west Poland
 Studnica, Pomeranian Voivodeship, north Poland)
 Studnica, Warmian-Masurian Voivodeship}, north Poland)
 Studnica, West Pomeranian Voivodeship, north-west Poland
 Stara Studnica, Gmina Kalisz Pomorski, Poland
 Nowa Studnica, Gmina Tuczno, Poland
 Studnica lake, Poland

See also 
 Studnice (disambiguation)